Elm Cottage/Blanding Farm is a historic house at 103 Broad Street in Rehoboth, Massachusetts.  The main block of this -story farmhouse was built c. 1800; its rear kitchen ell was added c. 1840.  The house was the site of a long-successful local farming operation owned by the Blanding family.  One of its early residents was Dr. William Blanding, a physician who also wrote a significant early work on the older houses of Rehoboth.

The house was listed on the National Register of Historic Places in 1983.

See also
National Register of Historic Places listings in Bristol County, Massachusetts

References

Houses in Bristol County, Massachusetts
Buildings and structures in Rehoboth, Massachusetts
Houses on the National Register of Historic Places in Bristol County, Massachusetts
Farms on the National Register of Historic Places in Massachusetts